Paide Linnameeskond U21  is an Estonian football club, the reserve team of Paide Linnameeskond. Until 2013 they played under the name Paide Kumake.

Statistics

League and Cup

Players

Current squad
 ''As of 19 May 2017.

References

Sport in Paide
Estonian reserve football teams
Paide Linnameeskond
2008 establishments in Estonia
Association football clubs established in 2009